Atascadero High School (formerly Margarita Black Union High School) is an American public high school located in Atascadero, California. Atascadero High School is 1 of 2 high schools in the Atascadero Unified School District. The school receives its students mainly from the Atascadero Junior High School and Atascadero Fine Arts Academy, and also attracts students from outlying areas of northern and eastern San Luis Obispo County.

Curriculum 
The school offers different paths of study, from trade-based programs to a wide variety of college prep, honors, and advanced placement courses.

Extracurricular activities

Sports
The school's biggest athletic rival is Paso Robles High School. Both schools are now part of the CIF Central Section as members of the Central Coast Athletic Association and have faced off over the years within the California Individual Finals.

Fall Sports
Football - CIF Southern Section champions: 1982, 1983, 1986 (Desert-Mountain Division), 1993, 1994, 1995, 1996 (Div. IX) / CIF Central Section champions: 2022 (Div. V) / CIF state champions: 2022 (Div. 6-A)
Boys Cross Country - CIF SS champions: 1985 (Div. 1-A)
Girls Cross Country - CIF SS champions: 1984 (Div. 1-A)
Boys Water polo
Girls Tennis
Girls Golf
Girls Volleyball

Winter Sports
Wrestling - CIF SS champions: 1984, 1985, 1986, 1987 (Div. 1-A), 1989 (Div. 2-A), 1995 (Div. III), 2003, 2004 (Northern Div.), 2009 (Eastern Div.)
Boys Basketball - CIF SS champions: 1969, 1974 (Div. 1-A)
Girls Basketball
Boys Soccer
Girls Soccer
Girls Water polo

Spring Sports
Baseball
Softball - CIF SS champions: 1993 (Div. IV)
Swimming
Diving
Boys Track and Field
Girls Track and Field - CIF SS champions: 1990 (Div. 1-A), 1999 (Div. III)
Boys Golf
Boys Tennis - CIF SS champions: 1996 (Div. IV)
Girls STUNT
Boys Volleyball

Clubs
The High School offers many clubs and allows students to form their own clubs. Some of the clubs are listed as the following:
Lit Club 
SkillsUSA Automotive Club
Rugby Club
Key Club
California Scholarship Federation Club (CSF)
National Honor Society Club
Choir Council
Bike Club
Future Farmers of America Club
Astronomy Club
Sci-fi Club
Yoga Club
Earth Club
K-pop Club
LGBTQ+ Club
Model United Nations Club
Filipino Culture Appreciation Club
Feminists Club

Programs

Performing Arts
Atascadero High School is home to a performing arts department.

Robotics
Atascadero High School is home to FIRST Robotics Competition Team 973 Greybots. In 2009 and 2013, the team won the Los Angeles Regional competition, and were selected second in the draft at the World Championship. In 2011, Team 973 was one of the three winners of the FIRST Championship in St. Louis. In 2017 and 2019, Team 973 won the FIRST Championship in Houston.

Auto Shop/SkillsUSA
Atascadero High School SkillsUSA Automotive teaches students how to work on their cars and get a career in the automotive service industry. Atascadero High School Competes in Region 2, which serves Fresno, Kern, Kings, Monterey, San Benito, San Luis Obispo, Santa Barbara, Santa Cruz, and Tulare counties. Students compete in Automotive Service Technology and Maintenance and Light Repair. In 2017 at the SkillsUSA State Conference in Ontario, California, the team earned a 3rd place medal in Automotive Service Technology.

History 
Atascadero High School was formerly known as Margarita Black Union High School. Work began on the original high school building designed by Colony Architect John Roth in 1920, but it wasn't until May 1921 that Atascadero Masonic Lodge No. 493 conducted the laying of the cornerstone. The original building featured a clock tower, a pitched tile roof and a large library with a fireplace on one end of the building, The clock tower was able to be viewed in all four directions. In the 1950s, the state of California decided the building was unsafe. The clock tower was taken down, the gable roof replaced with a flat one and the fireplace deemed unusable. This resulted in it becoming a square box building, which currently houses the theater rooms, and the original auditorium/gymnasium was knocked down in 1973. The last original building of the high school was recently taken down after close to 90 years of service due to safety hazards such as asbestos. The empty space is likely to be used for future facilities.

Notable alumni
 Jordan Cunningham - an American politician representing the 35th district in the California State Assembly
 Chuck Estrada - Major League Baseball pitcher/Baltimore Orioles All-Star
 Jared Hamman - current professional mixed martial arts fighter, formerly competing for the UFC
 Chelsea Johnson - Two-time NCAA-champion pole vaulter/Team USA silver medalist (pole vault) at 2009 IAAF World Championships
 Dan Loney - San Jose SaberCats center/three-time Arena Bowl champion
 Scott McClain - Chicago Cubs/San Francisco Giants infielder

References

External links 
Atascadero High School Official Website
Atascadero High Alumni Website

High schools in San Luis Obispo County, California
Buildings and structures in Atascadero, California
Atascadero, California
Public high schools in California